Keith Allen Clearwater (born September 1, 1959) is an American professional golfer who has won two tournaments on the PGA Tour.

Clearwater was born in Long Beach, California. He went to Northgate High School (Walnut Creek, California) and was one of many Californians to attend Brigham Young University in Provo, Utah and play on the school's golf team. In 1981, his junior year, he helped lead BYU to the 1981 NCAA Championship, and was named as a first team All-American. During his tenure at BYU, his teammates included future professional golfers Rick Fehr, Richard Zokol and Bobby Clampett. In his senior year, 1982, he was named as a second team All-American. He turned pro in 1982, and joined the PGA Tour in 1987.

Clearwater won two tournaments on the PGA Tour, both in his rookie season of 1987. He won the prestigious Colonial National Invitation in the spring of that year with a 14 under par 266, which tied the previous tournament record set by Corey Pavin in 1985. Later in that same season, he won the Centel Classic.

Clearwater has had a moderately successful career in professional golf. He has just over two dozen top-10 tournament finishes in PGA Tour events. His best finish in a major was a T-31 at the 1987 U.S. Open, which included a third round of 64 that tied the Olympic Club course record and remains one shot off of the U.S. Open record.

Clearwater lives in Murrieta, California. He also competed on the Champions Tour, but plays the PGA Tour's Colonial National Invitational every year. Most recently, Clearwater was hired by Pauma Valley Country Club, Pauma Valley, California as their Director of Instruction in February 2021.

Amateur wins (1)
1982 North and South Amateur

Professional wins (3)

PGA Tour wins (2)

Other wins (1)
1985 Alaska State Open

Results in major championships

CUT = missed the half-way cut
WD = Withdrew
"T" = tied

See also
1986 PGA Tour Qualifying School graduates
2000 PGA Tour Qualifying School graduates

References

External links

Northgate High School Athletics Website

American male golfers
BYU Cougars men's golfers
PGA Tour golfers
PGA Tour Champions golfers
Golfers from California
Golfers from Utah
Sportspeople from Long Beach, California
Sportspeople from Orem, Utah
1959 births
Living people